The Devonshire Association (DA) is a learned society founded in 1862 by William Pengelly and modelled on the British Association, but concentrating on research subjects linked to Devon in the fields of science, literature and the arts.

History 
The first meeting was held in Exeter, England in 1862 with a membership of 69 and, except for 1942, meetings have been held annually in different locations around the county every year since. Although similar in format to older groups such as the Plymouth Institution (inaugurated in 1812) and the Devon and Exeter Institution (1813), The Devonshire Association's aims were broader and more ambitious.

By 1877, there were around 500 members and this number remained fairly constant until just before the Second World War. In 1932 the first of a number of local branches was established in Plymouth, and subject-based sections were formed, specialising in botany, buildings, entomology, geology, history, literature, folklore and the dialect of Devon. By 1952 membership had risen to 1,100 and to over 1,800 by the centenary in 1963. In 2009 membership stood at 1,306.

Today 
The DA is a registered charity. Annually, it publishes its Report and Transactions which includes reports from the sections and branches, and peer reviewed research papers.

The association's three-day annual conference takes place in June, at a different Devon venue each year. At this event local visits are organised, along with a formal dinner and an AGM, at which an honorary president takes office, invited from those "of standing and importance" in the county. Since 2006 the association has also held an annual President's Symposium on a topic of his or her choosing; the one in 2007, for instance concerned farming in Devon.

A number of events take place throughout the year, including presentations, visits to notable places in the county, and training courses on various aspects of the association's work. The DA also makes grants to support Devon-related research projects.

The President for 2010–11 was Roger Thorne, JP, CEng, MICE, FSA who was succeeded by Professor Nicholas Orme, MA, DPhil, DLitt, FSA, FRHistS in 2011. The association's 150th anniversary in 2012 was marked by a major conference in Torquay, the home town of its founder, William Pengelly.

Some notable presidents
The year shown is the one in which the Presidential address was given.

1863 John Bowring
1864 Charles Spence Bate
1865 Charles Daubeny
1866 John Russell, 1st Earl Russell
1867 William Pengelly
1868 John Coleridge, 1st Baron Coleridge
1869 George Parker Bidder
1870 James Anthony Froude
1871 Charles Kingsley
1872 Frederick Temple, Bishop of Exeter
1875 Richard John King
1877 Alfred Earle
1878 Samuel White Baker
1879 Robert Collier, 1st Baron Monkswell
1884 Thomas Roscoe Rede Stebbing
1887 William Dallinger
1889 Wilfred Hudleston Hudleston
1895 Hardinge Giffard, 1st Earl of Halsbury
1896 Sabine Baring-Gould
1901 Roper Lethbridge
1903 Edgar Vincent, 1st Viscount D'Abernon
1905 Basil Thomson

1906 Frederick Thomas Elworthy
1907 Archibald Robertson, Bishop of Exeter
1908 Robert Collier, 2nd Baron Monkswell
1909 Charles Stubbs, Bishop of Truro
1911 Robert Burnard
1917 William Philip Hiern
1919 Henry Gamble, Dean of Exeter
1922 Henry Duke, 1st Baron Merrivale
1926 Richard Pearse Chope
1927 William Cecil Dampier
1928 Emma, Lady Radford
1929 George Parker Bidder III
1930 R. Hansford Worth
1931 Howard Masterman, Bishop of Plymouth
1934 J. C. Squire
1936 Robert Newman, 1st Baron Mamhead
1947 Ralegh Radford
1948 Leo Amery
1952 Margaret Cruwys
1953 Frederick Stratten Russell
1956 Hugh Fortescue, 5th Earl Fortescue
1957 Rev. S. C. Carpenter

1959 Leonard Knight Elmhirst
1960 Tony Giffard, 3rd Earl of Halsbury
1962 Robert Mortimer, Bishop of Exeter
1964 Derick Heathcoat-Amory, 1st Viscount Amory
1967 Wilfrid Westall, Bishop of Crediton
1971 G. Wilson Knight
1973 Lord Foot
1974 Richard Acland
1975 Sir Charles Cave, 4th Baronet
1978 William George Hoskins
1981 Frank Barlow
1984 Basil Greenhill
1988 John Parker, 6th Earl of Morley
1989 Joyce Youings
1997 Sir Hugh Stucley, 6th Baronet
2000 Richard Hawkins, Bishop of Crediton
2001 John Seymour, 19th Duke of Somerset
2003 Eric Dancer
2007 Justin Leigh
2011 Nicholas Orme

References

External links

Culture in Devon
Organizations established in 1862
Scientific societies based in the United Kingdom
Organisations based in Devon
1862 establishments in England
Regional and local learned societies of the United Kingdom